The 2014 Marbella Football Cup was held in February 2014 in Marbella, Spain. Four teams participated in the tournament, one from Bulgaria, one from Sweden, one from China and one from Romania. This tournaments was a predecessor of the current Marbella Cup tournament.

Teams
  PFC Lokomotiv Plovdiv
  FC Dinamo București
  IFK Göteborg
  Guangzhou Evergrande FC

Tournament Tree

Semi finals

Third place match

Final

Goalscorers
2 goals

 George Țucudean (Dinamo București)
 Rong Hao (Guangzhou Evergrande)

1 goal

 Kamil Biliński (Dinamo București)
 Steven Thicot (Dinamo București)
 Ludwig Augustinsson (Göteborg)
 Darijan Bojanić (Göteborg)
 Gustav Engvall (Göteborg)
 Lasse Vibe (Göteborg)
 Elkeson (Guangzhou Evergrande)
 Gao Lin (Guangzhou Evergrande)
 Tijani Belaïd (Lokomotiv Plovdiv)
 Joseph Mendes (Lokomotiv Plovdiv)

External links
Official site
https://web.archive.org/web/20140203052811/http://footballimpact.com/Marbella%20Cup/index.html

2014
2013–14 in Bulgarian football
2013–14 in Romanian football
2014 in Swedish football
2014 in Chinese football